Samuel Kalu Ojim (born 26 August 1997) is a Nigerian professional footballer who plays as winger for EFL Championship club Watford and the Nigeria national team.

Club career
Kalu started his football career at GBS Academy in Jos, Nigeria.

AS Trenčín
On 9 December 2015, Kalu agreed to sign a two-year contract with Slovak side AS Trenčín, a partner club with GBS Academy at the time. He made his professional debut for Trenčín against Slovan Bratislava on 27 February 2016.

Gent
On 4 January 2017, after his impressive displays in the Slovak League with Trenčín, Kalu was transferred to Belgium top division club KAA Gent.

Bordeaux
On 6 August 2018, Kalu signed for Ligue 1 side Bordeaux, signing a five-year contract. He was handed the number 10 jersey on arrival.

On 15 August 2021, Kalu collapsed in a game against Marseille. He was able to get up and walk off the pitch with his teammates’ help while holding an ice pack against his head. Eight minutes later, he was substituted off for Rémi Oudin.

Watford
On 26 January 2022, Kalu joined Premier League club Watford on a three-and-a-half year deal until 2025.

International career
On 13 October 2018, he scored his first international goal with the Nigeria senior national team against Libya. He scored the final goal in a 4–0 victory.

Kalu collapsed whilst participating in a team training session during the AFCON 2019 held in Egypt. Though rumours had it that he suffered a heart attack, this was later debunked as he collapsed as a result of severe dehydration. He was later released from the hospital to link up with the rest of the squad in Alexandria.

Personal life
Kalu's mother was released on 5 March 2019, having been kidnapped six days previously.

Career statistics

Club

International

Scores and results list Nigeria's goal tally first.

References

External links
 
 
 Futbalnet Profile
 AS Trenčín official club profile

1997 births
Living people
Nigerian footballers
Nigerian expatriate footballers
Association football wingers
AS Trenčín players
K.A.A. Gent players
FC Girondins de Bordeaux players
Watford F.C. players
Slovak Super Liga players
Belgian Pro League players
Ligue 1 players
Premier League players
People from Aba, Abia
Sportspeople from Abia State
2019 Africa Cup of Nations players
Expatriate footballers in Slovakia
Nigerian expatriate sportspeople in Slovakia
Expatriate footballers in Belgium
Nigerian expatriate sportspeople in Belgium
Expatriate footballers in France
Nigerian expatriate sportspeople in France
Expatriate footballers in England
Nigerian expatriate sportspeople in England
Nigeria international footballers